Rogówko may refer to the following places:
Rogówko, Toruń County in Kuyavian-Pomeranian Voivodeship (north-central Poland)
Rogówko, Żnin County in Kuyavian-Pomeranian Voivodeship (north-central Poland)
Rogówko, Rypin County in Kuyavian-Pomeranian Voivodeship (north-central Poland)
Rogówko, Warmian-Masurian Voivodeship (north Poland)